The Rumichaca Bridge (Quechua rumi stone, chaka bridge, "stone bridge") is the principal highway passage between Colombia and Ecuador. The Pan-American Highway crosses the bridge.

The stone bridge
Rumichaca received its name because here a natural stone bridge crosses the Carchi River (called the Guáitara River in Colombia).  The stone bridge is often called the "Inca Bridge."  The Carchi River was called the Angasmayo by the Incas and early Spanish colonists.  The bridge, according to Spanish chroniclers, was the northernmost outpost of the Inca Empire, wrested from the Pasto people in the early 16th century.  Atop this natural bridge are the old Colombian and Ecuadorian customs houses. Prior to the completion of the modern bridge in 1973, the stone bridge was used as a border crossing for goods and people.

The modern bridge
In 2013, 57.9 percent (about US$ one billion) of Colombia's exports to Ecuador crossed the border on the Rumichaca Bridge. In the same year, 77 percent (about US$ 650 million) of  Ecuador's exports to Colombia crossed the Rumichaca bridge.

Venezuelan refugees and migrants 
From May 2017 until July 2019 nearly 1.7 million Venezuelans entered Ecuador, most of them across the Rumichaca Bridge. The Venezuelan refugees and migrants were fleeing hunger and hyperinflation occurring in their country. Four hundred thousand remained in Ecuador and the others continued on to Peru, Chile, and Argentina.

References 

Bridges in Ecuador
Bridges in Colombia
International bridges
Inca Empire
Stone arch bridges